Benjamin or Ben Davis may refer to:

People

Entertainment
 Ben Davis (art critic) (fl. 2005–2013), American art critic and author of 9.5 Theses on Art and Class
 Ben Davis (cellist) (fl. 2003–2007), British jazz cellist
 Ben Davis (cinematographer) (born 1961), British cinematographer
 Ben Davis (writer), British writer of young adult books
 Benjamin Byron Davis (born 1972), American actor
 Benjamin Lazar Davis (born 1986), American multi-instrumentalist, singer-songwriter
 Benny Davis (1895–1979), vaudeville performer
 Benny Davis, member of the musical comedy trio The Axis of Awesome
 Ben Davis, former drummer of punk band Sugarcult

Military
 Benjamin Franklin Davis (1832–1863), American Civil War cavalry officer
 Benjamin O. Davis Sr. (1877–1970), first African-American general in the U.S. Army, father of Benjamin O. Davis Jr.
 Benjamin O. Davis Jr. (1912–2002), American general, commander of the World War II Tuskegee Airmen
 Bennie L. Davis (1928–2012), U.S. Air Force general

Sports
 Ben Davis (American football) (born 1945), American football player
 Ben Davis (Australian footballer) (born 1997), Australian rules footballer
 Ben Davis (basketball) (born 1972), American basketball player
 Ben Davis (baseball) (born 1977), American former catcher and pitcher
 Ben Davis (footballer, born 2000), Thai footballer

Other people
 Ben Davis (journalist) (born 1974), Australian sports journalist
 Ben G. Davis (born 1970), professor of chemistry at the University of Oxford
 Benjamin J. Davis Jr. (1903–1964), New York Communist city councilman and Communist Party USA leader imprisoned for violations of the Smith Act

Schools
 Ben Davis High School, an American high school in Marion County, Indianapolis, Indiana
 Benjamin Davis Elementary School, Alabama
 Benjamin Davis, Jr. High School

Other uses
 Ben Davis (apple), a type of apple
 Ben Davis (clothing), a United States-based work clothing line

See also
 Benjamin Davies (disambiguation)
 Benjamin Davis Jr. (disambiguation)
 List of people with surname Davis

Davis, Ben